Gata Salvaje (English: Wild Cat) is a telenovela which aired first on Venevisión in Venezuela on May 16, 2002, and some days later was released on the Spanish language U.S. TV network Univision from mid-summer of 2002 until May 2003, and later aired in Mexico on Canal de las Estrellas from January 2003 to December 2003.

This is one of two telenovelas starring Marlene Favela and Mario Cimarro as the main protagonists, the other being Los Herederos Del Monte from Telemundo.

Venezuelan actresses Carolina Tejera and  Marjorie de Sousa, Mexican actor Ariel López Padilla, Colombian actress Aura Cristina Geithner and Puerto Rican actress Mara Croatto stars as the main antagonists.

Plot 
Marco Sealvaje fratello di  Gata Sealvaje è sorella di Marco Sealvaje  tells the story of Rosaura Rios, a beautiful and kind young woman who lost her mother and who lives with her drunkard father Anselmo, her sisters Mayrita and Karina, her stepmother Maria Julia and her brother Ivan. She has no choice but to work during day as a lunch girl picking up food from the workers in the Arismendi's land; and at night, as a bartender in a nightclub in order to be able to sustain her family who lives in a small house next to the fabulous ranch of the wealthy Arismendi family. They lost their house due to the hurricane in Tampa.

Luis Mario Arismendi is an educated and handsome young man, heir to the family fortune, who loses his wife, Camelia, in an accident at sea, and she is never recovered. This event keeps him in a sentimental limbo for quite some time. But before that, both of them were together enjoying their honeymoon while Patricio, Camelia's former lover called to threaten her that if she refuses to leave Luis Mario, he would tell Luis Mario that he and Camelia are lovers; and he is the only one who gives Camelia the kind of life that she desires and wants. But Camelia decided to leave Luis Mario forever to escape with him.

Luis Mario decides to return from New York to take over the family business – the ranch – which is not in good financial standing. As he returns, the small plane in which he travels suffers an accident very close by to the ranch. Rosaura, who is in the area, reaches him and rescues him. Luis Mario instinctively kisses Rosaura and Rosaura is smitten.

Eduarda, Luis Mario's sister, is determined to see Luis Mario married to Eva Granados, a beautiful but impulsive and demanding rich girl that will guarantee that they will not be financially ruined; but Luis Mario, in order to go against his sister, marries Rosaura, who is deeply in love with him although he doesn't share the same feelings.

When they get married Eva kisses him on the mouth, Rosaura reacts by scratching him on the face, thus getting the name of "Wild Cat". Eduarda and Eva plan to make Rosaura's and Luis Mario's life miserable. They form a plan and murder Rosuara's  father by running him over. After trapping Rosaura in their games and turning Luis Mario against her,  they finally manage to break their marriage, this is also due to Rosaura's jealousy as women, Minerva, one of Eva closest friends, flaunts herself and publicly kisses Luis Mario. He also thinks her too wild to tame and too childlike, which finally causes him to divorce her. Sometime later, Luis Mario decides to leave for New York, hoping to make money to save his family ranch. He departs from his family in the airport, knowing that Rosaura is not far way, hiding behind a wall. When he boards the plane, he leaves not knowing that Rosaura is pregnant with his child. Later during Rosaura's revenge, she tells him this and he's saddened that she hadn't told him. She replied by saying" "That doesn't matter now (anymore)." It wasn't until later during the show that Rosaura revealed to Luis Mario that Eva was responsible murdering their unborn child by shooting her while she was riding on a horse.

Now Rosaura alone, penniless and sad begins a new life. But her luck is about to change when she finds out that she is the only descendant of Dona Cruz Olivares, a powerful and wealthy old lady who wants to find her granddaughter before she passes away. Her stepmother and half-sister try to rob her of this but Claudia, Dona Cruz's only daughter, who employs Rosaura and her brother Ivan, becomes suspicious. When Claudia meets Rosaura, she immediately likes her. One night, Claudia is searching through Rosaura's belonging and finds a hidden note, confirming that it is Rosuara the daughter of her deceased sister and deceased father Anselmo. Claudia decides to reveal the truth to Rosaura and unmask her stepmother and half sister. Rosaura becomes a sophisticated lady that will use her fortune to ruin all of those who harmed her in the past, and surely enough she does, including Luis Mario.

Her revenge begins on a night when Rosaura and Claudia attend a gallery show and sees Luis Mario, his believed-to-be dead wife, Camelia, Eva, and Eduarda. When Rosaura and Luis Mario make eye contact, Luis Mario walks up to her. He is impressed by her transformation. Rosaura tells Luis Mario: "I'm going to destroy your family Luis Mario. I'm going to destroy you." Luis Mario leaves in doubt but later he reveals to his best friend Gabriel, that he had taken her seriously and he was unsure of what to expect.

Luis Mario tries to reconquer her love but he gives up and lets Rosaura know that she is a different person. He asks her where is the feisty, innocent woman he fell in love with. She replied by saying that it was he who made her this way. Luis Mario ignores this and repeats she is a changed woman that wears too much makeup, overdresses instead of the woman who wore hair-ties and dressed like an ordinary everyday girl. Rosaura, the "Wild Cat", realizes that her transformation has turned her into a bitter and heartless woman, and she comes to understand that the love she feels for Luis Mario is unbreakable, and that aside from all the things she did to the Arismendi family, she passionately loves him.  Finally, after another long period of going through troubles and fighting their enemies, they will both be able to regain the happiness that long time ago escaped them.

In the mid-spring to early summer of 2011, Telefurtura gained the rights to the soap opera.  It was aired Monday-Friday at 10:00am.

Cast

References

External links
 

2002 American television series debuts
2003 American television series endings
Television shows set in Miami
Spanish-language American telenovelas
Venezuelan telenovelas
2002 Venezuelan television series debuts
2003 Venezuelan television series endings
2002 telenovelas
Venevisión telenovelas
Univision telenovelas